Angus Campbell MacInnes  (18 April 1901 – 29 April 1977) was an Anglican bishop in the third quarter of the twentieth century.

Angus Campbell MacInnes was born into a distinguished ecclesiastical family: his father, Rennie MacInnes, would be Bishop of Jerusalem from 1914 to 1931. He was educated at Harrow and Trinity College, Cambridge. After a curacy at St Mary Magdalene, Peckham, until 1927, he spent 23 years in the Middle East. He ended this part of his career as Archdeacon for Palestine, Syria and Trans-Jordan, succeeding Malcolm L. Maxwell in 1946, before returning to England. Between 1950 and 1953 he was then successively Vicar of St Michael's, St Albans, Rural Dean of the area and Bishop of Bedford (1953–1957) before returning to Israel to be Archbishop of Jerusalem and then Metropolitan of the Province. A Sub-Prelate of the Order of St John of Jerusalem, he died on 29 April 1977.

Work
 Angus Campbell MacInnes, "The Arab refugee problem", in: Journal of the Royal Central Asian Society; vol. 36, issue 2 (April 1949), pp. 178–188.

References

1901 births
People educated at Harrow School
Alumni of Trinity College, Cambridge
Bishops of Bedford
Anglican bishops of Jerusalem
Episcopal Church in Jerusalem and the Middle East archdeacons
20th-century Anglican archbishops
Companions of the Order of St Michael and St George
1977 deaths
Sub-Prelates of the Venerable Order of Saint John
20th-century Church of England bishops